Celebs on the Farm is a British television series that began broadcasting on 5Star from 20 August 2018, presented by Stephen Bailey. The first series consisted of 10 episodes, and was won by Gleb Savchenko. Celebs on the Farm returned for a second series on 26 August 2019. In April 2019, Bailey presented a spin-off version of the series, titled Celebs on the Ranch shot on a remote ranch in Arizona with a new lineup of celebrities. The series was moved to MTV for its third series.

Series overview

Series 1 (2018)

Results and elimination

 Keywords
 SAFE = The celebrity advanced to the next day.
 ELIM = The celebrity was eliminated.
 RUNNER-UP = The celebrity was the runner-up.
 WINNER = The celebrity was the winner.

 Colour key
 The celebrity was eliminated.
 The celebrity was awarded best in show.
 The celebrity was the runner-up.
 The celebrity was the winner.

Celebs on the Ranch (2019)

Results and elimination

 Keywords
 SAFE = The celebrity advanced to the next day.
 ELIM = The celebrity was eliminated.
 WD = The celebrity withdrew.
 RUNNER-UP = The celebrity was the runner-up.
 WINNER = The celebrity was the winner.

 Colour key
 The celebrity was eliminated.
 The celebrity withdrew.
 The celebrity was awarded a horse shoe.
 The celebrity was awarded a golden horse shoe and immunity until the finale.
 The celebrity was immune from elimination as a result of being awarded a golden horse shoe.
 The celebrity was the runner-up.
 The celebrity was the winner.

Series 2 (2019)

Results and elimination

 Keywords
 SAFE = The celebrity advanced to the next day.
 ELIM = The celebrity was eliminated.
 RUNNER-UP = The celebrity was the runner-up.
 WINNER = The celebrity was the winner.

 Colour key
 The celebrity was eliminated.
 The celebrity was awarded best in show.
 The celebrity was awarded a golden rosette and immunity from the next elimination.
 The celebrity was immune from elimination as a result of being awarded a golden rosette.
 The celebrity was the runner-up.
 The celebrity was the winner.

Series 3 (2021)

Results and elimination

 Keywords
 SAFE = The celebrity advanced to the next day.
 ELIM = The celebrity was eliminated.
 RUNNER-UP = The celebrity was the runner-up.
 WINNER = The celebrity was the winner.

 Colour key
 The celebrity was eliminated.
 The celebrity was awarded a best in show.
 The celebrity found the prize on the island and was immune from being eliminated
 The celebrity was awarded a golden rosette and immunity from the next elimination.
 The celebrity was immune from elimination as a result of being awarded a golden rosette.
 The celebrity was the runner-up.
 The celebrity was the winner.

References

External links
 
 
 

2018 British television series debuts
2021 British television series endings
2010s British reality television series
2020s British reality television series
Channel 5 (British TV channel) reality television shows
British television series revived after cancellation
Celebrity reality television series
MTV reality television series
English-language television shows